The Matter of Britain is the body of medieval literature and legendary material associated with Great Britain and Brittany and the legendary kings and heroes associated with it, particularly King Arthur. It was one of the three great Western story cycles recalled repeatedly in medieval literature, together with the Matter of France, which concerned the legends of Charlemagne, and the Matter of Rome, which included material derived from or inspired by classical mythology.

Name
The three "Matters" were first described in the 12th century by French poet Jean Bodel, whose epic  ("Song of the Saxons") contains the line:

The name distinguishes and relates the Matter of Britain from the mythological themes taken from classical antiquity, the "Matter of Rome", and the tales of the Paladins of Charlemagne and their wars with the Moors and Saracens, which constituted the "Matter of France".

Themes and subjects
King Arthur is the chief subject of the Matter of Britain, along with stories related to the legendary kings of Britain, as well as lesser-known topics related to the history of Great Britain and Brittany, such as the stories of Brutus of Troy, Coel Hen, Leir of Britain (King Lear), and Gogmagog.

Legendary history
The legendary history of Britain was created partly to form a body of patriotic myth for the country. Several agendas thus can be seen in this body of literature. According to John J. Davenport, the question of Britain's identity and significance in the world "was a theme of special importance for writers trying to find unity in the mixture of their land's Celtic, Anglo-Saxon, Roman and Norse inheritance."

Geoffrey of Monmouth's Historia Regum Britanniae is a central component of the Matter of Britain. Geoffrey drew on a number of ancient British texts, including the ninth century Historia Brittonum. The Historia Brittonum is the earliest known source of the story of Brutus of Troy. Traditionally attributed to Nennius, its actual compiler is unknown; it exists in several recensions. This tale went on to achieve greater currency because its inventor linked Brutus to the diaspora of heroes that followed the Trojan War. As such, this material could be used for patriotic myth-making just as Virgil linked the founding of Rome to the Trojan War in The Æneid.

Geoffrey lists Coel Hen as a King of the Britons, whose daughter, Helena marries Constantius Chlorus and gives birth to a son who becomes the Emperor Constantine the Great, tracing the Roman imperial line to British ancestors.

It has been suggested that Leir of Britain, who later became King Lear, was originally the Welsh sea-god Llŷr, related to the Irish Ler. Various Celtic deities have been identified with characters from Arthurian literature as well: for example Morgan le Fay was often thought to have originally been the Welsh goddess Modron or Irish the Morrígan. Many of these identifications come from the speculative comparative religion of the late 19th century and have been questioned in more recent years.

William Shakespeare was interested in the legendary history of Britain, and was familiar with some of its more obscure byways. Shakespeare's plays contain several tales relating to these legendary kings, such as King Lear and Cymbeline. It has been suggested that Shakespeare's Welsh schoolmaster Thomas Jenkins introduced him to this material. These tales also figure in Raphael Holinshed's The Chronicles of England, Scotland, and Ireland, which also appears in Shakespeare's sources for Macbeth.

Other early authors also drew from the early Arthurian and pseudo-historical sources of the Matter of Britain. The Scots, for instance, formulated a mythical history in the Pictish and the Dál Riata royal lines. While they do eventually become factual lines, unlike those of Geoffrey, their origins are vague and often incorporate both aspects of mythical British history and mythical Irish history. The story of Gabrán mac Domangairt especially incorporates elements of both those histories.

Arthurian cycle
The Arthurian literary cycle is the best-known part of the Matter of Britain. It has succeeded largely because it tells two interlocking stories that have intrigued many later authors. One concerns Camelot, usually envisioned as a doomed utopia of chivalric virtue, undone by the fatal flaws of the heroes like Arthur, Gawain and Lancelot. The other concerns the quests of the various knights to achieve the Holy Grail; some succeed (Galahad, Percival), and others fail.

The Arthurian tales have been changed throughout time, and other characters have been added to add backstory and expand on other Knights of the Round Table. The medieval legend of Arthur and his knights is full of Christian themes; those themes involve the destruction of human plans for virtue by the moral failures of their characters, and the quest for an important Christian relic. Finally, the relationships between the characters invited treatment in the tradition of courtly love, such as Lancelot and Guinevere, or Tristan and Iseult.

In more recent years, the trend has been to attempt to link the tales of King Arthur and his knights with Celtic mythology, usually in highly romanticized, 20th-century reconstructed versions. The work of Jessie Weston, in particular From Ritual to Romance, traced Arthurian imagery through Christianity to roots in early nature worship and vegetation rites, though this interpretation is no longer fashionable. It is also possible to read the Arthurian literature, particularly the Grail tradition, as an allegory of human development and spiritual growth, a theme explored by mythologist Joseph Campbell amongst others.

Noteworthy authors

Medieval

Anonymous

Modern

 Lloyd Alexander
 Alexandre Astier
 René Barjavel
 T. A. Barron
 Marion Zimmer Bradley
 Gillian Bradshaw
 Bernard Cornwell
 Sara Douglass
 David Drake
 Michael Drayton
 Hal Foster
 Parke Godwin
 Roger Lancelyn Green
 Raphael Holinshed
 Eric Idle
 David Jones
 Debra A. Kemp
 C. S. Lewis
 John Cowper Powys
 Howard Pyle
 William Shakespeare
 Edmund Spenser
 John Steinbeck
 Mary Stewart
 Rosemary Sutcliff
 Alfred Tennyson
 J. R. R. Tolkien
 Nikolai Tolstoy
 Mark Twain
 Richard Wagner
 Evangeline Walton
 Charles White
 T. H. White
 Jack Whyte
 Charles Williams

See also
 Avalon and Glastonbury
 Battle of Badon and Battle of Camlann
 Breton mythology and Cornish mythology
 English historians in the Middle Ages
 Historicity of King Arthur
 List of Arthurian characters
 List of works based on Arthurian legends
 Sites and places associated with Arthurian legend

References

Citations

Cited works

Other sources

External links

Arthurian Folklore - a website detailing Welsh Arthurian folklore
Arthurian Resources: King Arthur, History and the Welsh Arthurian Legends - detailed and comprehensive academic site, includes numerous scholarly articles, from Thomas Green of Oxford University
Arthuriana - the only academic journal solely concerned with the Arthurian Legend with a selection of resources and links
Celtic Literature Collective - provides texts and translations (of varying quality) of Welsh medieval sources, many of which mention Arthur
International Arthurian Society
The Camelot Project - provides valuable bibliographies of freely downloadable Arthurian texts from the sixth to the early 20th centuries, from the University of Rochester
The Heroic Age - an online peer-reviewed journal which includes regular Arthurian articles
The Medieval Development of Arthurian Literature - from H2G2
Vortigern Studies - a collection of articles on King Arthur by various Arthurian enthusiasts

Arthurian legend
Breton mythology and folklore
British folklore
British traditional history
English folklore
Geoffrey of Monmouth
History of literature
Holy Grail
Medieval literature
Metanarratives
Romance (genre)